Roger Scott was a British DJ.

Roger Scott may also refer to:

Roger Scott (photographer), Australian photographer
Roger Scott (American football) (born 1956), American football and baseball coach

See also
Scott (name)